Leontopodium hayachinense is a species of plant in the family Asteraceae. It is endemic to Japan and considered as a rare species by the IUCN since 1998.

References

hayachinense
Endemic flora of Japan
Plants described in 1935